This article concerns Sir Walter Raleigh's son. For his namesake and uncle, Sir Walter's brother, see Carew Raleigh

Carew Raleigh or Ralegh (1605–1666) was an English politician.

Biography
Raleigh was a son of Sir Walter Raleigh. Born in the Tower of London during his father's incarceration, he was educated at Wadham College, Oxford. After his father's death he was presented at court, but the King supposedly complained that he looked like his father's ghost, and later refused the royal assent to a parliamentary bill restoring his rights of blood; Charles I initially did the same, before eventually allowing it to be enacted in 1628.

Raleigh was elected to Parliament to fill a vacancy as Member for Haslemere in 1649, sitting until the Long Parliament was ejected in 1653, and briefly once more when the Rump was restored in 1659. At this stage he became a supporter of General Monck, and in February 1660 through Monk's influence he was nominated Governor of Jersey, though he never took up the post. After the Restoration he declined a knighthood, which instead was bestowed on his son, Walter.

He died at his London house in St Martin's Lane in 1666, and was buried at St Margaret's Church, Westminster in his father's grave. The register states that he was "kild", and it has been speculated that this means that he was murdered, but no details of his death are known.

See also
List of MPs not excluded from the English parliament in 1648

References

Bibliography

Further reading

English MPs 1648–1653
1605 births
1666 deaths
Carew
Alumni of Wadham College, Oxford